Jason Perry (born August 1, 1976) is a former American football safety in the National Football League (NFL). He played in the NFL from 1999 to 2002.

Perry was born in Passaic, New Jersey and attended Paterson Catholic High School.

References

1976 births
Living people
Paterson Catholic High School alumni
Sportspeople from Passaic, New Jersey
American football safeties
NC State Wolfpack football players
San Diego Chargers players
Minnesota Vikings players
Cincinnati Bengals players